Ronald "Ron" Howell (December 4, 1935 – March 16, 1992) was a Canadian football and hockey player.

Career 
Howell was a running back for the Hamilton Tiger-Cats of the Canadian Football League from 1954–1962. He won the CFL's Most Outstanding Canadian Award in 1958 and the Gruen Trophy as the outstanding rookie in the CFL East in 1954. He also played four games in the National Hockey League for the New York Rangers.

Personal life 
Howell is the brother of Hockey Hall of Famer Harry Howell.

Career ice hockey statistics

References

External links

Career bio

 

1935 births
1992 deaths
BC Lions players
Canadian Football League Most Outstanding Canadian Award winners
Canadian Football League Rookie of the Year Award winners
Canadian football running backs
Canadian ice hockey defencemen
Guelph Biltmore Mad Hatters players
Hamilton Tiger-Cats players
Ice hockey people from Ontario
Long Island Ducks (ice hockey) players
Montreal Alouettes players
New York Rangers players
Players of Canadian football from Ontario
Rochester Americans players
Sportspeople from Hamilton, Ontario
Toronto Argonauts players
Vancouver Canucks (WHL) players